The 2003 Guelph municipal election was held on November 10, 2003, in Guelph, Ontario, Canada, to elect the Mayor of Guelph, Guelph City Council and the Guelph members of the Upper Grand District School Board (Public) and Wellington Catholic District School Board. The election was one of many races across the province of Ontario, but was the only major city in the province where both of the leading candidates for mayor were women.

Election results
Names in bold denotes elected candidates. 
(X) denotes incumbent.

Mayor
One candidate to be elected.

Councillors
Two candidates per ward to be elected.

Ward 1

Ward 2

Ward 3

Ward 4

Ward 5

Ward 6

Timeline
September 22, 2003 - Nominations close.
November 10, 2003 - Election Day.

Issues
Wal-Mart at 6 & 7
Subbor breach of contract

See also
2003 Ontario municipal elections

References

2003 Ontario municipal elections
2003